A synthetic radioisotope is a radionuclide that is not found in nature: no natural process or mechanism exists which produces it, or it is so unstable that it decays away in a very short period of time. Examples include technetium-95 and promethium-146. Many of these are found in, and harvested from, spent nuclear fuel assemblies. Some must be manufactured in particle accelerators.

Production
Some synthetic radioisotopes are extracted from spent nuclear reactor fuel rods, which contain various fission products. For example, it is estimated that up to 1994, about 49,000 terabecquerels  (78 metric ton) of technetium was produced in nuclear reactors, which is by far the dominant source of terrestrial technetium.

Some synthetic isotopes are produced in significant quantities by fission but are not yet being reclaimed.  Other isotopes are manufactured by neutron irradiation of parent isotopes in a nuclear reactor (for example, Tc-97 can be made by neutron irradiation of Ru-96) or by bombarding parent isotopes with high energy particles from a particle accelerator.

Many isotopes are produced in cyclotrons, for example fluorine-18 and oxygen-15 which are widely used for positron emission tomography.

Uses
Most synthetic radioisotopes have a short half-life. Though a health hazard, radioactive materials have many medical and industrial uses.

Nuclear medicine
The field of nuclear medicine covers use of radioisotopes for diagnosis or treatment.

Diagnosis
Radioactive tracer compounds, radiopharmaceuticals, are used to observe the function of various organs and body systems. These compounds use a chemical tracer which is attracted to or concentrated by the activity which is being studied. That chemical tracer incorporates a short lived radioactive isotope, usually one which emits a gamma ray which is energetic enough to travel through the body and be captured outside by a gamma camera to map the concentrations. Gamma cameras and other similar detectors are highly efficient, and the tracer compounds are generally very effective at concentrating at the areas of interest, so the total amounts of radioactive material needed are very small.

The metastable nuclear isomer Tc-99m is a gamma-ray emitter widely used for medical diagnostics because it has a short half-life of 6 hours, but can be easily made in the hospital using a technetium-99m generator.

Treatment
Several radioisotopes and compounds are used for medical treatment, usually by bringing the radioactive isotope to a high concentration in the body near a particular organ. For example, iodine-131 is used for treating some disorders and tumors of the thyroid gland.

Industrial radiation sources

Alpha particle, beta particle, and gamma ray radioactive emissions are industrially useful. Most sources of these are synthetic radioisotopes. Areas of use include the petroleum industry, industrial radiography, homeland security, process control, food irradiation and underground detection.

Footnotes

External links
Map of the Nuclides at LANL T-2 Website

Radioactivity
Radiopharmaceuticals

af:Radio-aktiewe isotoop